Doctor Timothy Reuben Ladbroke "Tim" Black CBE (7 January 1937 – 11 December 2014) was a family planning pioneer and founder of Marie Stopes International in London. He served as chief executive of Marie Stopes International for 30 years, from 1976 to 2006.

During that time he built Maries Stopes International into one of the world's largest family planning organisations, which now works in more than 40 countries providing family planning and reproductive healthcare to over six million couples each year.

Black was appointed a CBE in the 1994 Queen's Birthday Honours for 'Services to International family Planning in Developing Countries'.

Early work and education

Tim Black grew up in a village in Sussex, England, where he met his future wife Jean. The pair were married in 1962, after he qualified in medicine, and started their adventures together by travelling to South Africa and then up to Salisbury in Southern Rhodesia (now Harare in Zimbabwe), where Black spent a year as a house doctor. After Black's year in Rhodesia he and Jean took off three months and drove in a DKW jeep up through Africa, across to Tunis, Europe and back home to Sussex.

On his return to England, Black worked as a senior house officer and registrar while studying for membership of the Royal College of Physicians at Croydon General and Harefield Hospitals. Jean, meanwhile, worked as a medical secretary at Queen Mary's Hospital in Carshalton.

In 1966, looking for more excitement, the couple drove to India through Europe, the Middle East, Afghanistan and Pakistan. Jean, by this time, was expecting their first child.

Black described in his own words the moment he became convinced of the urgent need for family planning:

"As a physician committed to a full-time career in fertility control I am often asked the question: When did you first become interested in family planning. I can quote the year, the month, the day. I was visiting an aid post in a rural, remote jungle area of New Guinea. Towards the end of a long day, a woman of about 30, in a grass skirt, shyly laid a small crying baby on the crude bamboo table which served as an examination couch. The baby, a three-month-old boy with a distended abdomen, had a small hernia. He was dehydrated and like many babies in that region, underfed, for mothers are often unable to obtain the adequate protein diet so necessary for a good flow of breast milk. Besides, she was still suckling another child of about two-and-a-half years. I reduced the size of the hernia, but it was obvious that if it was not operated on it would recur and eventually strangulate. In that case, unless the mother was able to walk the 10 miles or so to the river and then bring the baby by canoe to the hospital, or unless a doctor or nurse was traveling in the area, the baby would die. As I handed back the baby and the little bundle of rags which passed for nappies, I gently explained to the mother the need to perform a small operation at our little district hospital; otherwise the swelling would return and the child might die. In Pidgin English, lingua franca of New Guinea, the phrase for death has a brutal finality about it: 'Pininin belon' you'e die pinish' - die finish. Without emotion the mother began to tell me of her troubles. She had four young children and her husband had recently died. She was unable to spend enough time finishing or preparing sago - the staple diet of the area - and the sale of copra from her few coconut trees did not raise enough cash to meet the meagre needs of her family. She ended her sad monologue of tragedies by saying that she could not leave the family to take this baby to a distant hospital. I pleaded, cajoled, even threatened; but she was adamant. She would not leave her other children, nor would she let me take the baby down the river with me to the hospital. Eventually we compromised. I would perform the operation right there in the crude village dispensary. The operation went well despite my inexperience in this field and the primitive conditions. We anaesthetised the infant with ether and gauze. The wound was neat, bleeding had not been a problem, and we finished before the evening swarm of mosquitoes had become unbearable. I was deeply satisfied and success had released the tension of the operation. Proudly I carried the limp and still sedated baby out to the mother, who was squatting in the shade of a tree with her children. As I handed her the baby and she saw he was still alive her face fell in obvious disappointment. My shock was absolute. My immediate reaction was one of utter indignation. The gulf separating my life experience and that of this pitifully poor native woman was complete. She had wanted the baby to die - not live - during the operation. I suddenly realised that I had presented her not only her baby, but with another mouth to feed - another dependent human being to whom she could offer nothing: no father, no education, no future - merely the cruel ritual of her bare survival. It was at that moment that I began to realise that preventing a birth could be as important as saving a life"

Returning to England, Black gained a Diploma in Tropical Medicine and Hygiene at the Liverpool School of Tropical Medicine. In 1969 he obtained Population Council and Ford Foundation Fellowships to take a master's degree in Population dynamics at the University of North Carolina. By then the couple's second daughter, Julia, had been born.

Later work and experience

During Black's time in Carolina, he and Jean met Phil Harvey, an American also studying Population Dynamics, and they put together plans to sell condoms through the post. Harvey commented:
"Tim loves a good fight. I have always been especially fond of him for this reason, as it is a propensity I share. He has never been afraid of controversy, never been awed by the establishment organisations and figures in our profession, or any other".
After completing their degrees in 1970, the two men decided to continue with the organisation. Harvey stayed at the 'head office' in Chapel Hill, while Tim and his family left for Africa to set up the organisation's first US-funded Contraceptive Social Marketing (CSM) Programme in Kenya. Malcolm Potts, a close friend and now a professor at University of California, Berkeley, remembers:
"In 1972 I co-edited a book called New Concepts in Contraception. Tim Black and Phil Harvey wrote a chapter on the commercial
distribution of contraceptives, but the work of foresight and pure genius was a chapter Tim wrote called 'Ten institutional obstacles to advances in family planning'. I still use it in my teaching."
When Black returned to the UK in 1974, he and Jean set up a European branch of PSI - Population Services Family Planning Programme Ltd - which became known as Population Services, and eventually Marie Stopes International. The following year the Marie Stopes Memorial Foundation went into liquidation and Black and Harvey put up money to buy the lease of the famous clinic at 108 Whitfield Street, London W1, where Marie Stopes had opened her Mothers Clinic in 1925.
"Here Tim was free to implement his vision of professional management, outsourcing, limited medical involvement and treating family planning consumers as customers not patients. As a result, Marie Stopes International has become one of the most cost-effective, courageous institutions with
a truly global impact", explains Malcolm Potts.
By 1977, a number of vasectomy centres had been established throughout Britain and the operation was generating surplus income. This enabled Population
Services to launch its first overseas programme with the opening of the Well Woman Centre in Dublin, Ireland. In 1978 a non-profit society, known as Parivar Seva Sanstha was opened in India under the management of Peter Lawton. These were soon followed by programmes in Sri Lanka and Kenya. Henrietta Search, who joined MSI in 1985, remembers how Tim and a small team strove to achieve more than their limited resources could really sustain.
"I arrived one day at the centre in Whitfield Street and it became apparent that no one had thought about an office for me", says Henrietta.
"Tim introduced me to people in various rooms saying 'is there room for Henrietta in here?’ to which the answer was always 'no'. Finally it was decided that I should share a room in the basement with two enormous reclining chairs, but vacate it on Fridays, removing all the office paraphernalia, so that it could be used as a vasectomy recovery room!”
Despite being a doctor himself, Black was sometimes critical of the involvement of the medical profession in family planning, says Atula Nanayakkara, former Chief Executive of Population Services Lanka:
"He felt strongly that medical concepts of service delivery were largely inappropriate for the delivery of family planning services. He was quick to
point out that, after all, the world’s fertile were anything but sick.
"He and Jean were innovators, searching for change, responding to it and exploiting it as an opportunity. And above all, they were entrepreneurs, willing to take risks shifting resources and building financially self-reliant programmes around the world".
Tim Black stepped down as Marie Stopes International's Chief Executive in 2006 and stayed on as a member of the Marie Stopes International Board of Directors. Dana Hovig was appointed as Black's successor in January 2007.

He died on 11 December 2014.

See also 
 Marie Stopes
 Marie Stopes International
 Abortion debate
 Phil Harvey
 Malcolm Potts

References 

 
 
 Marie Stopes International
 Marie Stopes International UK site

External links 
 Marie Stopes International
 Marie Stopes International (UK website)

1937 births
2014 deaths
Commanders of the Order of the British Empire
20th-century English medical doctors